Molodyozhny (masculine), Molodyozhnaya (feminine), or Molodyozhnoye (neuter) may refer to:
Molodyozhny (inhabited locality) (Molodyozhnaya, Molodyozhnoye), name of several inhabited localities in Russia
Molodyozhnaya (Minsk Metro), a station of the Minsk Metro, Minsk, Belarus
Molodyozhnaya (Moscow Metro), a station of the Moscow Metro, Moscow, Russia
Molodyozhnaya Station (Antarctica), a former Soviet research station in Antarctica
Molodezhny (Karaganda Region), Kazakhstan